Vanina is a rural locality in Dolzhenkovsky Selsoviet Rural Settlement, Oktyabrsky District, Kursk Oblast, Russia. Population:

Geography 
The village is located on the Bolshaya Kuritsa River (a right tributary of the Seym River), 74 km from the Russia–Ukraine border, 15 km south-west of Kursk, 2.5 km north-west of the district center – the urban-type settlement Pryamitsyno, 5 km from the selsoviet center – Bolshoye Dolzhenkovo.

 Streets
There are the following streets in the locality: Komaryovka, Novaya, Sadovaya, Staraya and Studenaya (245 houses).

 Climate
Vanina has a warm-summer humid continental climate (Dfb in the Köppen climate classification).

Transport 
Vanina is located 10 km from the federal route  Crimea Highway (a part of the European route ), 3 km from the road of regional importance  (Kursk – Lgov – Rylsk – border with Ukraine), on the road of intermunicipal significance  (Dyakonovo – Starkovo – Sokolovka), on the road  (38N-073 – Vanina), 5 km from the nearest railway station Dyakonovo (railway line Lgov I — Kursk).

The rural locality is situated 27 km from Kursk Vostochny Airport, 123 km from Belgorod International Airport and 230 km from Voronezh Peter the Great Airport.

References

Notes

Sources

Rural localities in Oktyabrsky District, Kursk Oblast